The International Malware Conference, abbreviated as MalCon and stylized as MALCON is a computer security conference targeted on the development of malware.

Announcements 
Some new announcements made at MalCon include malware that can share USB smart card reader data, Windows Phone 8 malware, security problems with counterfeit phones and the AirHopper attack.

See also 
 DEF CON
 Chaos Communication Congress

References

External links 
 

Hacker conventions
Recurring events established in 2010